Events in the year 2003 in Germany.

Incumbents
President – Johannes Rau
Chancellor – Gerhard Schröder

Events
 6–16 February: 53rd Berlin International Film Festival
 7 March: Germany in the Eurovision Song Contest 2003
 27 March: Death of Jeremiah Duggan
 2 July: Coburg shooting
 14 July: Accident on the Bundesautobahn 5

Elections
 Bavarian state election, 2003
 Bremen state election, 2003
 Hessian state election, 2003
 Lower Saxony state election, 2003

Sport
 2003 Men's European Volleyball Championship
 2002–03 Bundesliga
 2002–03 2. Bundesliga
 2002–03 Deutsche Eishockey Liga season
 2003 European Grand Prix
 2003 German Grand Prix
 2003 German motorcycle Grand Prix
 2003 BMW Open

Deaths
5 February - Manfred von Brauchitsch, German racing driver (born 1905)
3 March - Horst Buchholz, German actor (born 1933)
18 March - Karl Kling, German racing driver (born 1910)
28 March - Ludwig Elsbett, German engineer (born 1913)
18 April - Rudolf Brunnenmeier, German football player (born 1941)
30 May - Günter Pfitzmann, German actor (born 1924)
5 June - Jürgen Möllemann, German politician (born 1945)
25 July - Ludwig Bölkow, German aeronautical pioneer (born 1912)
26 July - Jürgen Brandt, German general (born 1922)
14 August - Helmut Rahn, German football player (born 1929)
28 August - Peter Hacks, German playwright and author (born 1928)
28 August - Philipp-Ernst, Prince of Schaumburg-Lippe, German nobleman (born 1928)
8 September - Leni Riefenstahl, German film director, producer, screenwriter, editor, photographer, actress and dancer. (born 1902)
21 October - Werner Krüger, German engineer (born 1910)
26 October - Heinz Piontek, German writer (born 1925)
23 November - Lothar Emmerich, German football player (born 1941)
27 November - Will Quadflieg, German actor (born 1914)

See also
2003 in German television

References

 
Years of the 21st century in Germany
2000s in Germany
Germany
Germany